The Witch of Blackbird Pond is a children's novel by American author Elizabeth George Speare, published in 1958. The story takes place in late 17th-century New England. It won the Newbery Medal in 1958.

Plot summary
In April 1687, 16-year-old Katherine Tyler (known as Kit) leaves her home in Barbados after her grandfather dies and a 50-year-old man tries to marry her. She relocates to Wethersfield, Connecticut to live with her Aunt Rachel, Uncle Matthew, and her two cousins, Judith and Mercy, in their Puritan community.

A brief stop is made in Old Saybrook, Connecticut, to pick up four new passengers. As the small rowboat returns to the ship, a young girl named Prudence accidentally drops her doll in the water and begs her harsh mother, Goodwife Cruff, to get it back for her. Impulsively, Kit jumps into the water and retrieves the doll. She is then met with astonished suspicion, as few white people in Connecticut could swim so well. Cruff is the most skeptical of them all, believing Kit is a witch, commenting, "No respectable woman could stay afloat like that." On the slow trip upriver, Kit befriends John Holbrook, another passenger coming to Wethersfield to study with the Reverend Gershom Bulkeley.  

Kit finds Wethersfield very different from Barbados. Unlike at her previous home, where Kit's family owned servants and slaves, she is expected to work here along with the rest of the family. Her cousin Mercy has a lame leg and is on crutches. Kit is required to attend the Sabbath church meetings twice each Sunday, which she finds dull. Kit meets a rich young man, William Ashby.  He begins courting her, though she does not care for him. Originally, her cousin Judith had hoped to marry William, but she focuses on John Holbrook, a divinity student studying with Bulkeley.

Kit's life improves when she and Mercy begin teaching some young children of Wethersfield, who are preparing for traditional school. Everything proceeds well until one day, bored with the normal lessons, Kit decides the children will reenact a passage from the Bible: the parable of the Good Samaritan. The head of the school, Eleazer Kimberly, enters the house just as things get out of hand. He is outraged at Kit for having the audacity to act out something from the Bible and shuts down the school. Heartbroken, Kit flees to the meadows where she meets and befriends the kind, elderly Hannah Tupper, who was outlawed from the Massachusetts colony because she is a Quaker and does not attend church meetings, as well as being suspected of being a witch. With Hannah's support, Kit convinces Kimberly to give the school another chance.

As fellow outcasts, Kit and Hannah develop a deep bond, and even after her uncle forbids Kit to continue the friendship, she keeps visiting Hannah. During one of her visits, Kit again meets the handsome Nathaniel (Nat) Eaton, son of the captain of the Dolphin. Without realizing it, she falls in love with him, and though he doesn't say so, Nat reciprocates. Unfortunately, Nat is banished from Wethersfield after setting lit jack-o-lanterns in the windows of William Ashby's unfinished home. Nat is threatened with 30 lashes if he returns to Wethersfield. Kit also begins secretly teaching Prudence to read and write; Goodwife Cruff claims the child is a half-wit and "stupid" and refuses to allow her to attend the dame school.

When a deadly illness sweeps through Wethersfield, a mob gathers to kill Hannah by burning her house. Kit rushes to warn Hannah, and the two women escape to the river just as the Dolphin appears from the early morning mist. Kit flags it down.  Nat takes Hannah aboard and invites Kit to come with them. She refuses, explaining that Mercy is gravely ill, though Nat believes Kit fears losing her engagement to William Ashby.

After the Dolphin sails away, Kit returns home to find that Mercy's fever has broken. In the middle of the same night, the townspeople come for Kit; Goodwife Cruff's husband has accused her of being a witch. The next day, after a freezing night in the sheriff's shed, Kit is asked to explain the presence of her hornbook in Hannah's house and a copybook with Prudence's name written throughout, as the townspeople fear that she and Hannah were casting a spell over the girl. Kit refuses to reveal that Prudence wrote her own name, as Kit does not wish to cause the girl trouble with her parents. 

Just as Kit seems to be declared guilty, Nat appears with Prudence, who testifies that Kit was only giving her lessons. To demonstrate her literacy, Prudence reads a Bible passage and writes her name, thus convincing her father both that she is intelligent and that no witchcraft could be involved, as the devil would be foolish to allow a child to be taught to use the Bible against herself. While Nat is initially in trouble for returning and evades capture, Kit's Uncle Matthew intervenes on his behalf.

Soon after, Kit breaks off her engagement to William.  Two engagements are announced: Mercy to John Holbrook and Judith to William Ashby. Kit decides to return to Barbados. However, she decides to talk to Nat first.  Nat returns to Wethersfield with a surprise: he is the captain of a new boat. The boat is called the Witch, named after Kit. Kit asks to come on board the Witch but Nat says no, until he gets her Uncle Matthew's permission to marry her.

Characters
Katherine Tyler: Better known as "Kit," she is the protagonist, an independent, rebellious, and kind girl from a rich family in Barbados who lived with her grandfather before he died and struggles to find a new identity in Wethersfield as she lives with her Puritan aunt, Rachel, in the colony she is also thought of to be a witch.
Sir Francis Tyler: Kit's grandfather (deceased).
Hannah Tupper: A Quaker and outcast who is often rumored to be a witch, very mysterious.
Nathaniel Eaton: Called "Nat" by most. He is Captain Eaton's son, and also Kit Tyler's true love and eventual husband.
Rachel Wood: Kit's gentle aunt, the timid wife of Matthew Wood.
Matthew Wood: Kit's strict Anti-Royalist uncle, an independent man. He is the husband of Rachel Wood and initially not fond of Kit.
Mercy Wood: Kit's compassionate and patient cousin, sister of Judith, daughter of Matthew and Rachel Wood, requires crutches after an illness impacted her mobility. Marries John Holbrook.
Judith Wood: Kit's haughty cousin, sister of Mercy, daughter of Matthew and Rachel Wood. Marries William Ashby.
William Ashby: Kit's rich suitor, ends up marrying Judith.
John Holbrook: Student of Dr. Gershom Bulkeley, who teaches him about theology, religion, and medicine, who is absorbed in learning, considers his teacher the highest of them all, and often doesn't think for himself. Ends up marrying Mercy.
Dr. Gershom Bulkeley: Royalist minister (historical figure), teacher of John Holbrook.
Goodwife Cruff: A narrow-minded local woman who accuses Kit of being a witch. Mother of Prudence Cruff.
Goodman Adam Cruff: Goodwife Cruff's meek husband and father of Prudence Cruff.
Prudence Cruff: Cruff's young, mistreated daughter who befriends Kit.
Captain Eaton: Captain of the Dolphin and Nat's father.
Mistress Eaton: Captain Eaton's wife.
Eleazer Kimberly: A Puritan schoolmaster (historical figure).
Governor Edmund Andros: Governor of the Dominion of New England (including Connecticut), an officer of the King's Dragoons, and a knight (historical figure).
Captain Samuel Talcott: Magistrate (historical figure).

Allusions to local geography
Many places in the novel are actual locations in Old Wethersfield, Connecticut. They include:
Blackbird Pond (later renamed Wethersfield Cove)
Great Meadows
Congregational church on Main Street
Buttolph-Williams House is considered to be the house Kit lived in.
Connecticut river
Old Wethersfield

Reception
At the time of the book's publication, Kirkus Reviews said: "Kit's vindication, her gradual integration into the community and the positive effect she has on those about her, combine here in a well documented novel to rival the author's first work, Calico Captive, which received wide acclaim as a work of 'superior historical fiction'." In a retrospective essay about the Newbery Medal-winning books from 1956 to 1965, librarian Carolyn Horovitz wrote of The Witch of Blackbird Pond, Carry On, Mr. Bowditch, Rifles for Watie and The Bronze Bow: "All have value, all are told skilfully. If they lack the qualities of greatness, it is largely because their style has a commercial sameness."

References

1958 American novels
Novels set in the American colonial era
Novels set in Connecticut
Newbery Medal–winning works
Wethersfield, Connecticut
Houghton Mifflin books
Novels set in the 17th century
American children's novels
Children's historical novels
1958 children's books